This is a list of the National Register of Historic Places listings in Newton County, Texas.

This is intended to be a complete list of properties listed on the National Register of Historic Places in Newton County, Texas. There are six properties listed on the National Register in the county. Two are Recorded Texas Historic Landmarks including one that is also a State Antiquities Landmark.

Current listings

The locations of National Register properties may be seen in a mapping service provided.

|}

See also

National Register of Historic Places listings in Texas
Recorded Texas Historic Landmarks in Newton County

References

External links

Newton County, Texas
Newton County
Buildings and structures in Newton County, Texas